"Atterrissage" is a song by Ronisia. It was released on June 12, 2020.

Charts

Certifications

References

2020 songs
2020 singles